Secret speech or Secret Speech may refer to:

On the Cult of Personality and Its Consequences, Khrushchev's Secret Speech
Obersalzberg Speech, Adolf Hitler's 1937  secret speech to his supreme commanders
The Secret Speech, a novel by Tom Rob Smith
Secret language (disambiguation)